Bryneglwys is a village and community in Denbighshire, Wales. The village lies to the northeast of Corwen on a hill above a small river, Afon Morwynion. It had a population of 369 at the time of the 2011 census, an increase from 344 during the 2001 census. The 2011 census showed 36.0% of the population could speak Welsh, a fall from 50.3% in 2001. The name of the village means "church hill" in English and was first recorded in 1284 with the spelling "Breneglus".

A 'community portal' website with village news, views and local information can be found at bryneglwys.co.uk.

The village church is dedicated to Saint Tysilio. There has been a church on the site since the 7th century, but the current building dates from the 15th century and was restored around 1570 and again in 1875. Yale Chapel was added to the church around 1575.

The nearest primary school is Ysgol Dyffryn Iâl in the village of Llandegla. It is a bilingual school under the control of the Church in Wales.

The 16th-century historian David Powel came from the village. To the northeast of the village stands Plas yn Iâl, the ancestral home of the Yale family who included Elihu Yale, a benefactor of Yale University in the USA. He is buried in nearby Wrexham.

References

External links

 bryneglwys.co.uk - village news, views and local information.
 Bryneglwys, a vision of Britain through time.

Villages in Denbighshire
Communities in Denbighshire